Aleksandar Ivoš (Serbian Cyrillic: Александар Ивош; 28 June 1931 – 24 December 2020) was a Serbian footballer.

Career
Born in Valjevo, Ivoš started his football career in neighbouring FK Loznica before moving to FK Mačva Šabac in 1951. Three years later, his move from Mačva to FK Vojvodina generated notoriety, as the two clubs were fierce local rivals during the pre-war Yugoslavia. His move to Vojvodina in 1954 was a major move in his career, as the club was coached at the time by Vujadin Boškov and counted on a number of Yugoslav national team players. He would stay 7 seasons in Novi Sad. Afterwards, he played for FK Sloboda Tuzla before moving abroad to play in Austria and Belgium, including a spell with Wiener Sport-Club.

References

External links
Profile at Serbian federation official site
From Novi Sad to Simmering, wieninternational.at

1931 births
2020 deaths
Sportspeople from Valjevo
Serbian footballers
Yugoslav footballers
Yugoslavia international footballers
Yugoslav First League players
Belgian Pro League players
FK Loznica players
FK Mačva Šabac players
FK Vojvodina players
FK Sloboda Tuzla players
K. Beringen F.C. players
Serbian expatriate footballers
Expatriate footballers in Austria
Expatriate footballers in Belgium
1962 FIFA World Cup players

Association football forwards